Fenton Whitlock Booth (May 12, 1869 – July 26, 1947) was a member of the Illinois House of Representatives and later chief justice of the Court of Claims.

Education and career

Born on May 12, 1869, in Marshall, Clark County, Illinois, Booth attended DePauw University, where he was a member of Delta Upsilon, and received a Bachelor of Laws in 1892 from the University of Michigan Law School. He entered private practice in Marshall from 1892 to 1905. He was a member of the Illinois House of Representatives from 1896 to 1898. He was a delegate to the 1904 Republican National Convention. He was dean of Howard University Law School from 1922 to 1930. He was a professor at the National University Law School (now George Washington University Law School) from 1931 to 1938. He was a professor at Southeastern University in Washington, D.C. He refused to accept remuneration for any of his academic service. He was Chairman of Board #10 of the Office of Price Administration in Indianapolis, Indiana.

Federal judicial service

Booth was nominated by President Theodore Roosevelt on March 14, 1905, to a seat on the Court of Claims (later the United States Court of Claims) vacated by Judge Francis Marion Wright. He was confirmed by the United States Senate on March 17, 1905, and received his commission the same day. His service terminated on April 23, 1928, due to his elevation to be Chief Justice of the same court.

Booth was nominated by President Calvin Coolidge on April 18, 1928, to the Chief Justice seat on the Court of Claims vacated by Chief Justice Edward Kernan Campbell. He was confirmed by the Senate on April 18, 1928, and received his commission the same day. He assumed senior status on June 15, 1939. His service terminated on July 26, 1947, due to his death in Indianapolis.

Personal

Booth was the nephew of California political figure Newton Booth. He married Mabel Dana on December 17, 1893.

References

Sources
 

1869 births
1947 deaths
Republican Party members of the Illinois House of Representatives
Judges of the United States Court of Claims
United States Article I federal judges appointed by Theodore Roosevelt
20th-century American judges
Deans of law schools in the United States
DePauw University alumni
University of Michigan Law School alumni
People from Marshall, Illinois
19th-century American politicians
Illinois lawyers
19th-century American lawyers
20th-century American lawyers